is a Japanese politician of the Social Democratic Party, a member of the House of Councillors in the Diet (national legislature). A native of Yomitan, Okinawa and 1958 graduate of Ryukyu University, he was elected to the House of Councillors for the first time in 2007 after serving as mayor of Yomitan for six terms (24 years).

References

External links 
 Official website in Japanese.

Members of the House of Councillors (Japan)
1935 births
Living people
Social Democratic Party (Japan) politicians
Mayors of places in Okinawa Prefecture